Jean Regnault de Segrais (22 August 1624, Caen – 25 March 1701) was a French poet and novelist born in Caen. He was elected a member of the Académie française in 1662.

1624 births
1701 deaths
Writers from Caen
Mayors of Caen
Members of the Académie Française
French poets
17th-century French male writers
17th-century French novelists
French male poets
French male novelists